Maurits Basse (5 September 1868 – 18 February 1944) was a Belgian writer and teacher, one of the founders of the Liberaal Vlaams Verbond.

Basse was born at Ledeberg.  He became a professor at the University of Ghent, where he remained until his death.  He was editor of the journal Het Volksbelang and of the De Vlaamse Gids.

Bibliography
 Maurits Basse, Stijlaffectatie Bij Shakespeare,Kessinger Publishing, LLC (1895)
 Maurits Basse, Het Aandeel der Vrouw in de Nederlandse Letterkunde, Deel I, Gent, Uitgevers- en Boekdrukkershuis AD. Hoste (1920)
 Maurits Basse, Het Aandeel der Vrouw in de Nederlandse Letterkunde, Deel II, Gent, Uitgevers- en Boekdrukkershuis AD. Hoste (1921)
 Maurits Basse, De Vlaamsche beweging van 1905 tot 1930, Volume 1, Van Rysselbergh & Rombaut, (1930)
 Maurits Basse, De 'Gedichten van den Schoolmeester
 Maurits Basse,  Ingoldsby Legends 
 Maurits Basse,  Frederick van Jenuen en Cymbeline

Sources
 Maurits Basse (Liberal Archive)
 Luykx, Th. (Ed.), Rijksuniversiteit Gent, Liber Memorialis 1913-1960, Ghent, 1960, Vol. IV, pp. 384–385.

1868 births
1944 deaths
Flemish activists